Fitzwarren may refer to:

Fouke FitzWarren or Fulk FitzWarin (c. 1160–1258), English nobleman turned outlaw from Whittington Castle in Shropshire
Norton Fitzwarren, village and civil parish in Somerset, England
Stanton Fitzwarren, village and civil parish near Swindon, Wiltshire, England
Fitzwarren, name of the merchant in the story of Dick Whittington and His Cat

See also
Norton Fitzwarren rail crash (1890)
Norton Fitzwarren rail crash (1940)
Norton Fitzwarren railway station